Muzondo High School is located Takavarasha, Chivi District, Masvingo Province, Zimbabwe.

Notable alumni include Paul Takawira, Hon. Amos Chibaya, Movement for Democratic Change Member of Parliament for Mkoba.

References

Chivi District
Educational institutions with year of establishment missing
High schools in Zimbabwe
Buildings and structures in Masvingo Province
Education in Masvingo Province